Charles Clark Loomis, (February 26, 1921 - July 14, 2011) was a mathematical physicist on Project Orion.

Loomis joined General Atomics division of General Dynamics Corporation at the John Jay Hopkins Laboratory for Pure and Applied Science, San Diego, California.

Project Orion
Loomis, was a mathematical physicist from Los Alamos, who helped Ted Taylor with his ideas for Project Orion. He in charge of General Atomic's first computers. Loomis's office was next door to Taylor's. Taylor told him about the sense of discouragement because Orion was so big, but he said "Well, think big! If it isn't big, it's the wrong concept. What's wrong with it being big?" it was this discussion that everything flipped for Project Orion. It was Loomis's call that if you were serious about exploring the solar system, who not use something the size of the Queen Mary? He understood that bombs could in principle do it. Loomis is listed on a report indicating he had worked on the meter model tests.

Later career
Charles Loomis joined S-Cubed after Project Orion was cancelled.

Death
Loomis died on July 14, 2011.

References
 We Hear That
 In Loving Memory of Charles Clark Loomis
 Charles Loomis Condolences | Legacy.com
 Charles Loomis Obituary - Oceanside, CA
 News of Science

1921 births
2011 deaths
Mathematical physicists
Place of birth missing
Place of death missing
20th-century American physicists